Epectaptera miniata is a moth of the subfamily Arctiinae. It was described by Rothschild.

References

 Natural History Museum Lepidoptera generic names catalog

Arctiinae